The 9th World Cup season began in December 1974 in France and concluded in March 1975 in Italy.  Gustav Thöni of Italy would regain the overall title, his fourth overall title in five seasons. Annemarie Moser-Pröll of Austria won the women's overall title, her fifth consecutive.

Three major changes took place on the World Cup circuit this season.  First, Alpine combined races were recognized as World Cup events for the first time; both the men's and women's seasons included three combined races, all of which were won by the overall winners (Thöni and Moser-Pröll); in fact, Thöni's three combined wins were directly responsible for his edging out Ingemar Stenmark for the title.  Second, a parallel slalom race was held at the end of the season, as parallel slalom had become popular on the professional skiing tour due to the visible head-to-head competition.  Although parallel slalom skiing was used a few more times in World Cup competition, beginning in 1976 it became a permanent part of the season-ending Nations Cup events.

Third, and more importantly, the new head of the International Olympic Committee, Lord Killanin, reached a compromise to preserve the "amateur" status of skiers receiving endorsements, manufacturer's fees, and other payments, as long as the payments were made to the skier's national association or Olympic committee and not directly to the skier, that also eliminated the prohibition on year-round training and competition in a sport.  While further criticism of this rule, known as Olympics Rule 26, would continue and would lead to future problems, such as the banning of World Cup champions Stenmark and Hanni Wenzel from the 1984 Winter Olympics, the immediate impact of this change was to check the steady migration of World Cup skiers to the professional circuit.  Partially as a result, World Cup races this season took place in Europe, North America, and Asia.

Calendar

Men

Ladies

Men

Overall 
The Men's Overall World Cup 1974/75 was also divided into three periods with only a part of the results from each period being retained for the Overall standings.

Downhill 
In Men's Downhill World Cup 1974/75 the best 5 results count. Franz Klammer won 6 races in a row and won the cup with maximum points. He won 8 races out of 9, but at the downhill of Megève one of his bindings opened and he did not finish the race; this meant also that he could not score the 15 points for a third place in the combined of Megève (which he would have gained easily after a decent slalom result in Chamonix two days earlier), and in the end he missed the first place in the Men's Overall World Cup by just 10 points.

Giant Slalom 
In Men's Giant Slalom World Cup 1974/75 the best 5 results count.

Slalom 
In Men's Slalom World Cup 1974/75 the best 5 results count.

Combined 

There was no special discipline world cup for Combined awarded. All three results only count for the Overall World Cup. Gustav Thöni won all three competitions. This was the important key that enabled Thöni to defeat Ingemar Stenmark in the Overall World Cup standings.

Ladies

Overall 

The Women's Overall World Cup 1974/75 was divided into two periods. From the first 14 races the best 7 results count and from the last 12 races the best 6 results count. Eight racers had a point deduction. Annemarie Moser-Pröll had a total deduction of 106 points. She won ten competitions and was unable to score points only in three events. This was her fifth overall win in a row.

Downhill 

In Women's Downhill World Cup 1974/75 the best 5 results count. Annemarie Moser-Pröll won her fifth Downhill World Cup in a row. This record is still unbeaten.

Giant Slalom 

In Women's Giant Slalom World Cup 1974/75 the best 5 results count. Annemarie Moser-Pröll won five races in a row and won the cup with maximum points.

Slalom 

In Women's Slalom World Cup 1974/75 the best 5 results count. Lise-Marie Morerod won the cup with only four results.

Combined 

There was no special discipline world cup for Combined awarded. All three results only count for the Overall World Cup. Annemarie Moser-Pröll won all three competitions.

Nations Cup

Overall

Men

Ladies

References

External links
FIS-ski.com - World Cup standings - 1975

FIS Alpine Ski World Cup
World Cup
World Cup